T. dubia may refer to:
 Tabebuia dubia, a plant species endemic to Cuba
 Thladiantha dubia, the goldencreeper, Manchu tuber-gourd, wild potato, thladianthe douteuse, a fieldweed and a rarely used ornamental plant species
 Trypeta dubia, a fruit fly species

See also
 Dubia (disambiguation)